Lorenzo Burnet (born 11 January 1991) is a Dutch professional footballer who plays as a left-back for Eredivisie club Emmen.

Club career
After starting as a footballer at amateur East Amsterdam club AVV Zeeburgia, Burnet joined the top-ranked Ajax Amsterdam youth system in 2004. He spent seven years as a youth player for Ajax but was not offered a senior contract.

In April 2011, Burnet and his team-mate Johan Kappelhof reached a three-year agreement with fellow Eredivisie club Groningen, a club managed by former Ajax youth coach Pieter Huistra. Burnet made his debut in a league game against Roda JC Kerkrade on 7 August 2011. He helped the Green-White Army win the KNVB Cup in 2014–15 against defending champions PEC Zwolle. It was their first major trophy and they qualified for the UEFA Europa League.

In May 2016, he joined Slovak club Slovan Bratislava. After making 8 appearances he was loaned out to NEC Nijmegen.

In June 2017, Burnet signed a two-year deal with Excelsior after his contract with Slovan Bratislava had been dissolved After playing the 2019–20 season for FC Emmen, Burnet moved to Denmark where he signed a season-long deal on 18 October 2020 with Danish 1st Division club HB Køge. He left the club again at the end of the 2020–21 season.

On 15 July 2021, he returned to Emmen on a one-year deal.

International career
Burnet was born in the Netherlands and is of Surinamese descent. Burnet represented the Netherlands at various youth level, including under-17 and under-19.

Honours
Groningen
 KNVB Cup: 2014–15

References

External links
 
 Voetbal International profile 

1991 births
Living people
Footballers from Amsterdam
Association football defenders
Dutch footballers
Dutch sportspeople of Surinamese descent
A.V.V. Zeeburgia players
FC Groningen players
ŠK Slovan Bratislava players
NEC Nijmegen players
Excelsior Rotterdam players
FC Emmen players
HB Køge players
Eredivisie players
Slovak Super Liga players
Danish 1st Division players
Netherlands youth international footballers
Netherlands under-21 international footballers
Dutch expatriate footballers
Expatriate footballers in Slovakia
Expatriate men's footballers in Denmark
Dutch expatriate sportspeople in Slovakia
Dutch expatriate sportspeople in Denmark